An independent power producer (IPP) or non-utility generator (NUG) is an entity that is not a public utility but owns facilities to generate electric power for sale to utilities and end users.  NUGs may be privately held facilities, corporations, cooperatives such as rural solar or wind energy producers, and non-energy industrial concerns capable of feeding excess energy into the system. 

An independent water and power producer (IWPP) is similar to an IPP, but with a unified process to also output usable treated water.

Economic situation
For most IPPs, particularly in the renewable energy industry, a feed-in Tariff or Power Purchase Agreement provides a long-term price guarantee.

IPPs have been successful in driving the electricity sector's transition to renewables globally, owning the majority of the currently operating renewable energy generation capacity.

Germany
Rare in Germany for decades, the IPP business model has grown more common since the EEG (for renewable energy). Success in the approach depends on finding a partner for distributing the produced energy to the customer.

Canada
In 2002, the government of British Columbia stipulated that new clean renewable energy generation in the province would be developed by "independent power producers" (IPPs) not BC Hydro, save for large hydro-electric facilities. The role of the private sector in developing BC’s "public" resources is one of the more controversial issues that British Columbians are currently grappling with.

Taiwan
Taiwan's electricity market was liberalized in January 1995. Nine IPP companies are currently operating in Taiwan.

United States
NUGs were rare before the enactment of the US Public Utility Regulatory Policies Act (PURPA) of 1978.  The few existing NUGs were seldom able to distribute power, as the cost of building the conveyance infrastructure was prohibitive.  Public utilities generated power and owned the generating facilities, the transmission lines, and the local distribution-delivery systems. PURPA, however, established a class of non‐utility generators, called Qualifying Facilities (QFs), that were permitted to produce power for resale. 

PURPA was intended to reduce domestic dependence on foreign energy, to encourage energy conservation, and to reduce the ability of electric utilities to abuse the purchase of power from QFs. A QF is defined as a generating facility that produces electricity and another form of useful thermal energy through the sequential use of energy, and meets certain ownership, operating, and efficiency criteria established by the Federal Energy Regulatory Commission (FERC).

Section 210 of PURPA now requires utilities to purchase energy from QFs at the utility's avoided cost. This allows QFs to receive a reasonable to excellent price for the energy they produce and ensures that energy generated by small producers won't be wasted.

Pakistan
In 1994, the Government of Pakistan announced an investor-friendly policy to develop IPPs based on oil, coal and gas. Following the policy, 16 IPPs were established. The next year, a hydro power policy was announced, which resulted in the development of the country's first Hydro IPP.

In 2002, the new government adopted a new policy, under which another 12 IPPs began operations. For the development of Independent Power Producers (IPPs), Private Power and Infrastructure Board operates as one window facilitator on behalf of all the departments and Ministries of the Government of Pakistan to; process power projects in IPP mode, monitor their development, and facilitates in providing all required support on behalf of the Government of Pakistan.

In 2015, Pakistan adopted a new power policy by which another 13 IPPs were established, mostly by Chinese companies. A transmission policy for development of transmission line in the private sector was also announced. 

More than 40 IPPs were operating in Pakistan as of 2018.

India 
India also has many IPP's like ReNew Power, Adani, Hero, Mytrah, Ostro, Greenko, Alfanar , Jakson Ltd.Etc.

South Africa 
The Renewable Energy Independent Power Producer Procurement Programme (REIPPPP) is an initiative by the South African government aimed at increasing electricity generation through private sector investment in solar photovoltaic and concentrated solar, onshore wind power, small hydro (<40 MW), landfill gas, biomass, and biogas. As of 2021, there were 117 allocations, totalling 8891.86 MW, for private sector generation.

References 

Electric power companies